Eddie Matos may refer to:

 Eddie Matos (actor) (born 1978), American actor
 Eddie Matos (musician), American DJ and music producer